Speight Jenkins Jr. (born January 31, 1937) is a classical music critic and music administrator. He was the general director of Seattle Opera from 1983 to 2014.

Early life and education
Jenkins, a native of Dallas, Texas, is the son of Speight Jenkins Sr. and Sara Baird Jenkins. His parents took him to his first opera at the age of 7, and he fell immediately in love with the art form.  His B.A. degree is from the University of Texas at Austin, and he graduated in 1961 from Columbia Law School.

Career
Jenkins served in the U.S. Army as a member of the Judge Advocate General’s Corps, and afterwards became a music critic and journalist.  He worked for seven years at Opera News as its news and reports editor, and later at the New York Post from 1973 to 1981 as music critic.  He has been a host for U.S. television's Live from the Metropolitan Opera and a guest speaker on the Metropolitan Opera radio broadcasts.

Tenure at Seattle Opera
In the early 1980s, Jenkins was a guest lecturer at Seattle Opera for the company's production of Richard Wagner's Der Ring des Nibelungen. His knowledge impressed the Seattle Opera board of trustees,  such that they offered him the post of general director of the company and he began his tenure in that post with the company in 1983. His contract was extended for another ten years, and in 2003, he signed another 10-year extension to his contract.

At Seattle Opera he has produced two complete cycles of Wagner's Ring, the first one directed by François Rochais and the second one by Stephen Wadsworth. He also produced new productions of the other six frequently produced Wagner operas, as well as new productions of Prokofiev's War and Peace, Debussy's Pelléas et Mélisande, Dvorak's Rusalka, Bellini's Norma, Gluck's Orfeo ed Euridice and 
Iphigénie en Tauride, four Strauss operas, many by Verdi and Puccini, plus several contemporary works. In 2010 Seattle Opera commissioned and gave the world premiere of Amelia, by Daron Hagen.

Jenkins stepped down as General Director of Seattle Opera in August 2014, and was replaced by Aidan Lang.

Other work
Jenkins has written an art book, Pelleas + Melisande + Chihuly, and narrated a 4-CD commentary called Enjoying Wagner's Ring of the Nibelung with Speight Jenkins.

In 2011 he won an Opera Honor from the National Endowment for the Arts. In the same year he received an honorary doctorate from the New England Conservatory.

Personal life
Jenkins and his wife, the former Linda Sands, have two children, Linda Leonie Jenkins and Speight Jenkins III.

References
Notes

Other sources
Melinda Bargreen (2 August 2014), "Speight Jenkins: Gracefully bowing out of Seattle Opera", The Seattle Times at seattletimes.com

Opera managers
1937 births
Living people
Classical musicians from Texas
University of Texas at Austin alumni
Columbia Law School alumni
New York Post people
Classical music radio people
People from Dallas
Journalists from Texas